St James's Church is a Grade II listed parish church in the Church of England in Hampton Hill, London.

History

The first church building was opened in 1863 to designs by the architect William Wigginton. It was later enlarged, with work starting in 1873. The tower was started in 1887 and completed early in 1889. The clock was provided by Smith of Derby in 1893.

Vicars

Fitzroy John Fitzwygram 1863–1881
Hon. Henry Bligh 1881–1893 
Charles Robert Job 1894–1914
Richard Coad-Pryor 1914–1923
Frederick Pearce Hope Harvey 1923–1950 
Rupert Hoyle Brunt 1951–1980 (formerly vicar of St Faith's Church, Nottingham)
John Nicholas Chubb 1981–1988
Dr Brian Leathard 1989–2006 
Peter Vannozzi 2006–2015
Revd Derek Winterburn 2016–

Organ

The church had a three manual pipe organ by Bishop which was obtained from St Peter's Church, Eaton Square, in 1874. This has subsequently been rebuilt and expanded by Hele and Co in 1912 and 1951, and again in 1997 by John Males when new stops were added from St Mary's Church, Twickenham. A specification of the organ can be found on the National Pipe Organ Register.

References

External links
 

1863 establishments in England
19th-century Church of England church buildings
Anglo-Catholic church buildings in the London Borough of Richmond upon Thames
Church of England church buildings in the London Borough of Richmond upon Thames
Churches completed in 1864
Diocese of London
Grade II listed churches in the London Borough of Richmond upon Thames